Birgitta Pettersson (born 7 January 1939) is a Swedish film actress. She is best known for her appearances in several films by director Ingmar Bergman. She was born in Uppsala, Sweden.

Filmography

References

External links

1939 births
Living people
People from Uppsala
20th-century Swedish actresses